Stuart Collins is an Australian former professional rugby league footballer who played in the 1990s. He played for the Newcastle Knights from 1994 to 1995 and the Hunter Mariners in 1997.

References

External links
http://www.rugbyleagueproject.org/players/Stuart_Collins/summary.html

Australian rugby league players
Hunter Mariners players
Newcastle Knights players
Living people
Year of birth missing (living people)
Place of birth missing (living people)